Westview High School is a public high school in Martin, Tennessee, United States. It is part of the Weakley County school district.  As of 2022, it has an enrollment of approximately 544 students. The current principal is Brian Allen.

History
Martin High School was established in 1925. The mascot was originally the Panthers until Fall 1970 when Martin High School was renamed Westview High School and the mascot was changed to the Chargers. In Fall 1971, the school moved into a newly constructed building. In Fall 1982, Sharon High School branched off from Westview High School, but was later re-consolidated in 1991.

Notable alumni
 Chad Clifton, NFL football player for the Green Bay Packers
 Elizabeth Donald, author
 Justin Harrell, NFL football player for the Green Bay Packers

References

External links
 School website
 Greatschools.net profile
 Weakley County School District
 Martin, Tennessee education

Public high schools in Tennessee
Educational institutions established in 1997
Schools in Weakley County, Tennessee
1997 establishments in Tennessee